In late January 2016, a cold wave struck much of East Asia, parts of mainland Southeast Asia and parts of northern South Asia, bringing record cold temperatures and snowfall to many regions. Sleet was reported in Okinawa for the first time on record, and many other regions saw their lowest temperatures in decades. Snowfall and frigid weather stranded thousands of people across four countries. At least 85 people in Taiwan died from hypothermia and cardiac arrest following a sudden drop in temperature during the weekend of January 22–24. The cold claimed a further fourteen lives in Thailand, and snowstorms resulted in six deaths across Japan.  This event was driven by a fast Arctic warming that occurred within the troposphere, forcing the Arctic Oscillation to change phase rapidly from positive (in late December) to negative (in late January), facilitating the atmospheric blocking and associated Siberian high buildup.

Hong Kong
Many were also on Tai Mo Shan participating in a 100 km marathon. 129 required rescue and 67 were hospitalised for signs of hypothermia. The Fire Services Department (FSD) deployed 53 fire appliances, 39 ambulances and more than 300 personnel. The Government Flying Service evacuated eight patients by helicopter from Tai Mo Shan and Sunset Peak to Pamela Youde Nethersole Eastern Hospital and the airport. The FSD also responded to 130 calls at Kowloon Peak. In addition, the Civil Aid Service and Hong Kong Police Force were mobilised.

Classes were cancelled for more than 510,000 students of kindergartens, primary schools, and the English Schools Foundation on 25 January. The closure was suggested by the Hong Kong Professional Teachers' Union and it is believed to have been the first time the Education Bureau has ever cancelled classes due to cold weather. In the face of some criticism the government noted that most schools do not have heaters. The vice chairman of the Aided Primary School Heads' Association stated that the decision was justified as slippery roads could endanger school buses, which in Hong Kong are not fitted with winter tires.

Japan
Snowstorms across Japan killed six people and injured 100 others. More than 600 flights were disrupted across the nation. Okinawa observed sleet for the first time since reliable records began. Amami Ōshima saw snow for the first time in 115 years. Record snowfall blanketed portions of the mainland, with Nagasaki observing . Temperatures fell to record lows across much of western Japan.
And Kamikawa in Hokkaido  record -32℃. Mt. Fuji recorded -31℃. Nagano recorded -25℃.

Mainland China
Snow and sleet were reported in parts of Guangzhou, the first time these had been observed since 1967 and 1956 respectively. Snow also fell on Shenzhen, a rare occurrence for the region. At least four people died of carbon monoxide poisoning from a heating system in Guangzhou. Farther north, the minimum temperature in Shanghai  with light snow falling on the morning of 23 January. Twenty-four weather stations observed all-time record lows.

Korean Peninsula

Snow and cold weather forced the cancellation of 1,200 flights on Jejudo, off the southwestern tip of the Korean Peninsula, stranding approximately 90,300 passengers.

Taiwan

Due to the subtropical climate, many homes do not have central heating or insulation, and residents struggled to cope with the temperatures. Overall, at least 85 people died from hypothermia and cardiac arrest in Taiwan, including 66 people in Taipei and Taoyuan, and another 16 in Kaohsiung. The majority of victims died in their homes. The Ministry of Health subsequently claimed only three people died and 45 were admitted to hospital emergency wards.

The cold weather caused severe damage to crops, with losses exceeding NT$20 million (US$600,000) in Miaoli County alone. President Ma Ying-jeou declared the crop damage a national concern.

Vietnam
Snowfall was recorded in the mountainous areas of Ba Vì near the capital on January 24.

Snow fell across the mountains of Lào Cai Province in Northern Vietnam. There was heavy snowfall in the area of Sa Pa town and the high mountains of Bát Xát District. This is the historical low temperature since the observation data in Sa Pa since 1956.

In Mẫu Sơn, Lạng Sơn Province, the temperature dropped below ; snow quickly covered the mountain slopes. In Tam Đảo District, Vĩnh Phúc Province, after many hours of frost, by the end of the morning of January 24, there was snow on the highest peak of Tam Đảo mountains. The same day, snow also fell in Hang Kia and Pà Cò communes in Mai Châu District of Hòa Bình Province. Temperatures were expected to continue to plummet.

Some other places recorded the first snowfall in their history, most notably the North Central Coast provinces. In Lũng Cao commune of Bá Thước District (Thanh Hóa Province) and Na Ngoi and Mường Lống communes of Kỳ Sơn District (Nghệ An Province), snowfall lasted for many hours early on January 24.

Rest of Southeast Asia

In the Batanes islands of the Philippines, temperatures dropped below 10 °C, a record low for the Philippines at sea level. In the mountainous city of Baguio, where tourists typically flock because of the cooler weather, temperatures dropped to 9 °C (48 °F), the city's coldest recorded temperature in 2016.

South Asia
Fog resulting from the low temperatures led to delays at Indira Gandhi International Airport and forced cancellations of train services in New Delhi.

In Nepal, 700 schools were shut in Rautahat and Parsa owing to thick fog and the cold, and the number of patients with cold-related diseases increased in medical facilities throughout the country.

See also
 January 2016 United States blizzard

References 

2016 disasters in China
2016 in Japan
2016 in North Korea
2016 disasters in South Korea
2016 in Taiwan
2016 in Hong Kong
2016 disasters in Vietnam
2016 disasters in India
2016 in Cambodia
2016 in Nepal
2016 in Thailand
2016 in Laos
2016 cold waves
East Asia,2016,01
Cold wave,2016,01
Cold wave,2016,01
Cold wave,2016,01
Cold wave,2016,01
Cold wave,2016,01
Cold wave,2016,01
East Asia cold wave
Weather events in Nepal
2016 disasters in Asia